Makdiops is a genus of Asian wall spiders that was first described by S. C. Crews & Mark Stephen Harvey in 2011.

Species
 it contains six species, found in Nepal and India:
Makdiops agumbensis (Tikader, 1969) – India
Makdiops mahishasura Crews & Harvey, 2011 – India
Makdiops montigena (Simon, 1889) (type) – India, Nepal
Makdiops nilgirensis (Reimoser, 1934) – India
Makdiops shevaroyensis (Gravely, 1931) – India
Makdiops shiva Crews & Harvey, 2011 – India

See also
 List of Selenopidae species

References

Araneomorphae genera
Selenopidae
Spiders of Asia